Perton is a civil parish in the district of South Staffordshire, Staffordshire, England. It contains nine listed buildings that are recorded in the National Heritage List for England.  All the listed buildings are designated at Grade II, the lowest of the three grades, which is applied to "buildings of national importance and special interest".  The parish contains the village of Perton and an area to the northwest.  The major building in the parish is Wrottesley Hall, which is listed, together with associated structures.  The other listed buildings include a farmhouse, a cottage, a barn, a dovecote, and a milepost.


Buildings

References

Citations

Sources

Lists of listed buildings in Staffordshire